Rourkela (Sl. No.: 12) is a Vidhan Sabha constituency of Sundergarh district.
Area of this constituency includes Rourkela, Kulunga (O.G) and two Gram panchayats of Bisra block.

Elected Members

Thirteen elections held during 1967 to 2019. List of members elected from Rourkela constituency are:
2019: (12): Sarada Prasad Nayak (BJD)
2014: (12): Dilip Ray (BJP)
2009: (12): Sarada Prasad Nayak (BJD)
2004: (139): Sarada Prasad Nayak (BJD)
2000: (139): Ajit Das (BJD)
1995: (139): Prabhat Mohapatra (Congress)
1990: (139): Dilip Ray (Janata Dal)
1985: (139): Dilip Ray (Janata Party)
1980: (139): Gurupada Nanda (Congress-I)
1977: (139): Brajakishore Mohanty (Janata Party)
1974: (139): Dhananja Mohanty (Congress)
1971: (125): Shyama Sundar Mahapatra (Orissa Jana Congress)
1967: (125): Rajkishore Samantray (Praja Socialist Party)

2019 Election Result
In 2019 election Biju Janata Dal candidate Sarada Prasad Nayak, defeated  Bharatiya Janata Party candidate Nihar Ray by a margin of 10,460 votes.

2014 Election Result
In 2014 election Bharatiya Janata Party candidate Dilip Ray, defeated Biju Janata Dal candidate Sarada Prasad Nayak by a margin of 10,929 votes.

2009 Election Result
In 2009 election Biju Janata Dal candidate Sarada Prasad Nayak, defeated Bharatiya Janata Party candidate Ramesh Kumar Agrawal 25,596 votes.

Notes

References

Sundergarh district
Assembly constituencies of Odisha
Rourkela